Vox clara ecce intonat is a Latin hymn used traditionally in the Liturgy of the Hours at Lauds during Advent. An alternative version of the same hymn begins "En clara vox redarguit."

History
The original version of the hymn dates from the 6th century. Whilst it has been attributed to a number of different authors, including St Ambrose, it is generally recorded in modern books as "anonymous." As a result of Pope Urban VIII's revision of the Breviary, the hymn was re-written in a more classical Latin style and published in 1632, with the opening line "En clara vox redarguit."

Style
The hymn is written in iambic dimeter and it is a retelling of the preaching of John the Baptist, announcing the coming of Christ in Luke's Gospel.

Latin versions of the Hymn

Vox clara ecce intonat

1  VOX clara ecce intonat,
   obscura quaeque increpat:
   procul fugentur somnia;
   ab aethere Christus promicat.

2  Mens iam resurgat torpida
   quae sorde exstat saucia;
   sidus refulget iam novum,
   ut tollat omne noxium.

3  E sursum Agnus mittitur
   laxare gratis debitum;
   omnes pro indulgentia
   vocem demus cum lacrimis,

4  Secundo ut cum fulserit
   mundumque horror cinxerit,
   non pro reatu puniat,
   sed nos pius tunc protegat.

5  Summo Parenti gloria
   Natoque sit victoria,
   et Flamini laus debita
   per saeculorum saecula. Amen.

En clara vox redarguit

1  En clara vox redarguit 
   Obscura quaeque personans: 
   Procul fugentur somnia: 
   Ab alto Jesus promicat.

2  Mens jam resurgat torpida, 
   Non amplius jacens humi: 
   Sidus refulget jam novum, 
   Ut tollat omne noxium.

3  En Agnus ad nos mittitur
   Laxare gratis debitum: 
   Omnes simul cum lacrimis 
   Precemur indulgentiam:

4  Ut, cum secundo fulserit, 
   Metuque mundum cinxerit, 
   Non pro reatu puniat, 
   Sed nos pius tunc protegat.

5  Virtus, honor, laus, gloria 
   Deo Patri cum Filio, 
   Sancto simul Paraclito, 
   In sæculorum saecula.

English Versions
It is estimated that there are at least 27 English translations of the hymn. The following examples were widely used in the nineteenth and twentieth century.

John Henry Newman

1  Hark, a joyful voice is thrilling, 
   And each dim and winding way 
   Of the ancient temple filling ; 
   Dreams depart, for it is day.

2  Christ is coming — from thy bed, 
   Earth-bound soul, awake and spring — 
   With the sun new-risen to shed 
   Health on human suffering.

3  Lo, to grant a pardon free, 
   Comes a willing Lamb from heaven ; 
   Sad and tearful, hasten we, 
   One and all, to be forgiven.

4  Once again he comes in light 
   Girding earth with fear and woe ; 
   Lord, be thou our loving might, 
   From our guilt and ghostly foe.

5  To the Father and the Son 
   And the Spirit, who in heaven 
   Ever witness, Three and One, 
   Praise on earth be ever given. 

John Mason Neale

1  A THRILLING voice by Jordan rings,
   rebuking guilt and darksome things:
   vain dreams of sin and visions fly;
   Christ in His might shines forth on high.

2  Now let each torpid soul arise,
   that sunk in guilt and wounded lies;
   see! the new Star's refulgent ray
   shall chase disease and sin away.

3  The Lamb descends from heaven above
   to pardon sin with freest love:
   for such indulgent mercy shewn
   with tearful joy our thanks we own.

4  That when again He shines revealed,
   and trembling worlds to terror yield.
   He give not sin its just reward,
   but in His love protect and guard.

5  To the most high Parent glory be
   and to the Son be victory,
   and to the Spirit praise is owed
   from age to age eternally. Amen

Edward Caswall

1  Hark! a thrilling voice is sounding:
   'Christ is nigh,' it seems to say;
   'Cast away the dreams of darkness,
   O ye children of the day!'

2  Wakened to the solemn warning,
   Let the earth-bound soul arise;
   Christ, her Sun, all ill dispelling,
   Shines upon the morning skies.

3  Lo! the Lamb, so long expected,
   Comes with pardon down from heaven;
   Let us haste, with tears of sorrow,
   One and all to be forgiven;

4  That when next he comes with glory,
   And the world is wrapped in fear,
   With his mercy he may shield us,
   And with words of love draw near.

5  Honour, glory, might, and blessing,
   To the Father and the Son,
   With the everlasting Spirit,
   While eternal ages run.

The Caswell translation is often sung to the tune Merton (87.87) by William Henry Monk.

See also 
List of Roman Catholic hymns
Canonical Hours
Lauds

References

External links
 Matthew Britt, The Hymns of the Breviary and Missal, Benziger Brothers, New York, 1922
 Alan Mc Dovgall, Pange Lingua: Breviary Hymns of old uses with an English rendering, Burns & Oates 1916
 Joseph Connelly, Hymns of the Roman Liturgy, 1957.
 Vox clara ecce intonat performed by Ensemble Officium
 Hark! A Herald Voice is Calling, sung (to the tune "Merton") by the Choir of King's College, Cambridge

Catholic liturgy
Latin-language Christian hymns
Latin religious words and phrases
Liturgy of the Hours